Comyn can refer to:

People
 Clan Cumming also known as Clan Comyn
 Comyn (surname)

Places
 Comyn Ching Triangle, triangular city block in Covent Garden, London
 Comyn, Texas, community located in Comanche County, Texas
 Newbold Comyn, a park in Leamington Spa, Warwickshire

Fiction
 The Comyn, characters in Darkover who exhibit special mental powers

See also
 Comyns (disambiguation)
 Cumming (disambiguation)